Assara balanophorae is a species of snout moth in the genus Assara. It was described by Sasaki and Tanaka, in 2004, and is known from Japan.

References

Moths described in 2004
Phycitini
Moths of Japan